William Cameron Forbes (May 21, 1870 – December 24, 1959) was an American investment banker and diplomat. He served as governor-general of the Philippines from 1909 to 1913 and ambassador of the United States to Japan from 1930 to 1932.

He was the son of William Hathaway Forbes, president of the Bell Telephone Company, who was part of the Boston Brahmin family that made its fortune trading in China, and wife Edith Emerson, a daughter of Ralph Waldo Emerson. He was grandson Sarah Hathaway and John Murray Forbes and Lidian Jackson and Ralph Waldo Emerson. After education at the Milton Academy and Boston's Hopkinson School and graduation from Harvard in 1892, he embarked on a business career, eventually becoming a partner in J. M. Forbes and Company.

Philippines
During the administration of President William Howard Taft, Forbes was Governor-General of the Philippines from 1909 to 1913. Previously, during the administration of President Theodore Roosevelt, he had been Commissioner of Commerce and Police in the American colonial Insular Government of the Philippines from 1904 through 1908; and he was Vice Governor from 1908 through 1909.

Forbes was an enthusiastic supporter of the summer capital at Baguio designed by Daniel Burnham, and had a country club and golf course added to the plans. The summer capital drew resentment from local Filipinos, as it put the government at a distance from the people and was paid for with money earmarked for postwar recovery. Forbes had a low opinion of Filipinos, regarding them as naturally subordinate and unready for self-government. He interacted with them as little as possible. In a 1909 diary entry he recounted an incident when he was playing golf with an Igorot caddy. Forbes wrote "I said to myself, 'Now how many am I?' and the boy replied, 'Playing five.' I was as much astonished as though a tree had spoken." Of the original 161 country club members only six were Filipino. One of them was future Philippines president Manuel Quezon. Forbes likened him to a "wonderfully trained hunting dog gone wild." Quezon in turn remarked that Forbes loved Filipinos "in the same way the former slave owners loved their Negro slaves." In 1908 diary entry, Forbes described how he and the other lawmakers completed their business at Baguio in "about an hour or less" and devoted the remainder of the day to leisure. 

Forbes, who was a polo enthusiast, founded the Manila Polo Club in 1919 at Pasay, Rizal. It was the first polo field in the Philippines. Forbes had envisioned the club as a venue for polo and leisure for "gentlemen of a certain class" assigned to work in the Philippines like himself. He served as delegate of the club until the outbreak of World War II. The clubhouse was inaugurated on November 27, 1909.

In 1921, President Warren G. Harding sent Forbes and Leonard Wood as heads of the Wood-Forbes Commission to investigate conditions in the Philippines. The Commission concluded that Filipinos were not yet ready for independence from the United States, a finding that was widely criticized in the Philippines.

As modest legacy from those years of service in Manila, the gated community of Forbes Park in Makati, was named after him; and this community is the residence of some of the wealthiest people in the country. Lacson Avenue (formerly Gov. Forbes Street) in Sampaloc, Manila is still called "Forbes" by some up to the present day.

Haiti
Forbes was appointed by President Herbert Hoover in 1930 to lead a commission charged with investigating the reasons for ongoing minor rebellions in Haiti. Forbes gave Hoover a plan to stabilize Haiti and remove the US Marines. An agreement in August 1931 started the withdrawal and a similar plan led to Hoover's withdrawal of troops from Nicaragua. Franklin Roosevelt later completed the process, calling it the "Good Neighbor policy."

Japan
Forbes was nominated by President Hoover and confirmed as United States Ambassador to Japan. He served from 1930 to 1932.

In 1935, Forbes headed an American Economic Mission to Japan and China to promote good business relations. The April 9, 1935 photo to the right presents Forbes meeting with the Japanese Minister of Commerce and Industry, Machida Chūji, at the official residence of Machida, in Tokyo. Together, they renegotiated agreements that would improve commercial relations between the two nations.

Friendship with George Santayana
W. Cameron Forbes was a life-long friend of George Santayana, who was a young professor at Harvard during Forbes's last three undergraduate years there. Forbes was one of the models for the protagonist Oliver Arden in Santayana's novel The Last Puritan.

Later years
Forbes received an LL.D. from Bates College in 1932. He was on the Board of Trustees, Carnegie Institution of Washington and a Life Member of the Corporation, Massachusetts Institute of Technology. He was on the original standing committee of the Foundation for the Study of Cycles from 1941. He died unmarried in 1959.

His seasonal home Birdwood, a mansion built in the 1930s for him in southern Georgia, is listed on the National Register of Historic Places.

Head coaching record

Sources
Forbes' papers are in the Houghton Library at Harvard University. Copies of his annotated journal are at the Library of Congress and the Massachusetts Historical Society, Boston. The report of the Forbes Commission's Haitian analysis is at the Library of Congress.

Philippine administrator:
 Peter W. Stanley, A Nation in the Making: The Philippines and the United States, 1899–1921 (1974)
 Rev. Camillus Gott, "William Cameron Forbes and the Philippines, 1904–1946" (Ph.D. diss., Indiana University, 1974)
 Theodore Friend, Between Two Empires: The Ordeal of the Philippines, 1929–1946 (1965).

Ambassador to Japan:
 Gary Ross, "W. Cameron Forbes: The Diplomacy of a Darwinist," in R. D. Burns and E. M. Bennett, eds., Diplomats in Crisis (1974).
 Robert H. Ferrell, American Diplomacy in the Great Depression: Hoover-Stimson Foreign Policy, 1929–1933 (1957)
 Armin Rappaport, Henry L. Stimson and Japan, 1931–1933 (1963)
 James B. Crowley, Japan's Quest for Autonomy (1966).

Selected works
Forbes wrote the following books and articles:
 1911 -- "As to Polo", Dedham Polo and Country Club.
 1921 -- The Romance of Business
 1935 -- Fuddlehead by Fuddlehead (autobiography) the Massachusetts Historical Society, Boston.
 1936 -- "A Survey of Developments in the Philippine Movement for Independence," Proceedings of the Massachusetts Historical Society, 1932–1936.
 1939 -- "American Policies in the Far East," Proceedings of the American Academy of Arts and Sciences (January 1939).

See also
 Iwahig Prison and Penal Farm

References

Further reading
 Bangs, Outram. Notes on Philippine birds collected by Governor W. Cameron Forbes (Litres, 2021).
 Spector, Robert M. "W. Cameron Forbes in the Philippines: A Study in Proconsular Power." Journal of Southeast Asian History 7.2 (1966): 74-92.
 Spector, Robert M. "W. Cameron Forbes in Haiti: Additional Light on the Genesis of the 'Good Neighbor' Policy" Caribbean Studies (1966) 6#2 pp 28-45.
 Spector, Robert Melvin. W. Cameron Forbes and the Hoover commissions to Haiti, 1930 (University Press of America, 1985).
 Stanley, Peter W. "William Cameron Forbes: Proconsul in the Philippines." Pacific Historical Review 35.3 (1966): 285-301. online

Primary sources
 Forbes, William Cameron. Report of the President's Commission for the Study and Review of Conditions in the Republic of Haiti: March 26, 1930 (US Government Printing Office, 1930) online.
 Forbes, W. Cameron. "American Policies in the Far East." Proceedings of the American Academy of Arts and Sciences. 73#2 (1939) online.
 Forbes, W. Cameron. "The Philippines under United States Rule." The ANNALS of the American Academy of Political and Social Science 168.1 (1933): 156-161.

External links

1870 births
1959 deaths
Ambassadors of the United States to Japan
Governors-General of the Philippine Islands
Harvard Crimson football coaches
Bates College alumni
Harvard University alumni
William Cameron
American expatriates in the Philippines
20th-century American diplomats